Eduard Khachikovich Partsikyan (born 5 July 1976) is a former Armenian professional footballer. He also holds Russian citizenship.

Club career
He made his professional debut in the Russian Third League in 1995, playing for FC Zhemchuzhina-d Sochi.

National team statistics

References

1976 births
Sportspeople from Sochi
Living people
Armenian footballers
Armenia international footballers
FC Zhemchuzhina Sochi players
FC Rubin Kazan players
FC Pyunik players
Russian Premier League players
Armenian Premier League players
Association football midfielders